= Chaupicruz =

Electoral district in Ecuador

Coordinates: 0.160254°S 78.503602°W

Chaupicruz is an electoral parish (Spanish: parroquia electorale urban) or district of Quito, the capital city of Ecuador in northwestern South America. The parish was established as a result of the October 2004 political elections when the city was divided into 19 urban electoral parishes.
